Otto Basil (24 December 1901 Vienna – 19 February 1983 (Pseudonyms: Markus Hörmann, Camill Schmall) was an Austrian writer, publisher and journalist.

Novels
 Wenn das der Führer wüsste (1966). In English: The Twilight Men (Meredith Press, 1968)

References

1901 births
1983 deaths
Austrian male writers
Journalists from Vienna
Austrian science fiction writers